The World's Drinks And How To Mix Them is a cocktail manual by William "Cocktail" Boothby originally published in 1900, with revised editions in 1908, 1930 and 1934. The publisher was the Palace Hotel in San Francisco, where Boothby worked.

The cover of the 1908 edition describes this as the "Standard Authority" by a "Premier Mixologist".

The book published the first recipe for the sazerac, one of the earliest recipes for a dry martini, as well as the Bronx cocktail.

References

External links
 Complete 1908 edition available online

1900 non-fiction books
1900 in California
20th century in San Francisco
American cookbooks
Cocktails
Culture of San Francisco